Peter Walsh  (born 9 January 1954) is an Australian basketball player. He competed in the men's tournament at the 1976 Summer Olympics and the 1980 Summer Olympics.

References

External links
 

1954 births
Living people
Australian men's basketball players
1978 FIBA World Championship players
Olympic basketball players of Australia
Basketball players at the 1976 Summer Olympics
Basketball players at the 1980 Summer Olympics
Place of birth missing (living people)